Abraham Lincoln Stanfield (September 4, 1860 – August 5, 1927) was an American businessman and politician.

Biography
Stanfield was born on a farm near Edgar, Edgar County, Illinois. He went to the public schools and to business college. Stanfield lived in Paris, Illinois and was a grain dealer. Stansfield served in the Illinois House of Representatives from 1911 until his death in 1927. He was a Republican. Stanfield died from cancer at his home in Paris, Illinois.

References

External links

1860 births
1927 deaths
People from Paris, Illinois
Businesspeople from Illinois
Republican Party members of the Illinois House of Representatives
Deaths from cancer in Illinois